Valentina Sergeevna Savina (born 1943) is a retired Soviet sprint cyclist who won three gold, one silver and two bronze medals at the UCI Track Cycling World Championships in 1962–1970. She competed for 16 years and was awarded the Order of the Red Banner of Labour.

References

1943 births
Living people
Soviet female cyclists
UCI Track Cycling World Champions (women)
Russian track cyclists
Place of birth missing (living people)